Yang Song (born 23 June 1989 in Yuxi) is a Chinese tumbling trampoline gymnast, representing his nation at international competitions. He won medals at world championships, including at the 2009, 2010, 2011, 2013, 2014 and 2015 Trampoline World Championships.

He took up gymnastics in 1995, and began trampolining in 2000 in Yunnan Province. He was named an International Elite Athlete by the General Administration of Sport of China in 2008.

In March 2018, Yang was convicted of contractual fraud and sentenced to 10 years and four months in prison.

Personal
He pursued higher education at the Beijing Sport University.

References

External links
 

1989 births
Living people
Chinese male trampolinists
People from Yuxi
Medalists at the Trampoline Gymnastics World Championships
Gymnasts from Yunnan
20th-century Chinese people
21st-century Chinese people